The Riot Act 1411 (13 Hen 4 c 7) was an Act of the Parliament of England.

The words from "and the same justices" to "made to the contrary" were repealed by section 1 of, and Schedule 1 to, the Statute Law Revision Act 1948.

The whole Chapter, so far as unrepealed, was repealed by section 10(2) of, and Part I of Schedule 3 to, the Criminal Law Act 1967.

The 13 Hen 4, of which this chapter was part, was repealed for the Republic of Ireland by section 1 of, and Part 2 of the Schedule to, the Statute Law Revision Act 1983.

See also
Riot Acts

References
Halsbury's Statutes,

External links
List of repeals in the Republic of Ireland from the Irish Statute Book.

Acts of the Parliament of England
1410s in law
1411 in England